The Interosseous intercarpal ligaments are short fibrous bands that connect the adjacent surfaces of the various carpal bones.

Hand
Ligaments